Demala Hatpattu (Tamil Seven Regions) or Demala Pattu or Demala Pattuva  was a medieval and pre colonial division of Sri Lanka. It was a regional political division formed by royal land grants. There were number of such Pattus across the country.  Demela Hatpattu was named as such because at its time of creation, it was exclusively governed by Tamil hereditary chiefs. The land was granted to Chiefs of Kerala Tamil Mukkuvar chiefs initially, later on given to Karava chiefs migrated from Coromandel Coast for services rendered or as a result of conquest by Mukkuvas. (See Mukkuvar and Vannimai) 

The Pattu consisted of the following subdivisions

Panditha Pattuva
Kirimettiya Pattuva
Karamba Pattuva
Periavelli Pattuva
Muneswaram Pattuva
Anevilundan Pattuva
Kumaravanni Pattuva
Rajavanni Pattuva

Of which Muneswaram Pattuva alone had over 63 inhabited villages. It was believed that Chiefs of Munneswarm Pattuva  began the Munneswaram temple as a village guardian temple  to Munisvaran around 1000 CE. Within the Mueswaram Pattuva, Maradankulama provided the political leadership for the area. Demala Hatpattu formed a large division within the current Puttalam District. During the British Colonial period Demala Hatpattu transferred between numbers of provinces. In 1873, when the North Central Province was created, Demala Hatpattu was detached from the North Western Province but in 1875, Demala Hatpattu was reattached to the North Western Province.

Notes

References 
 
 

Geography of Sri Lanka
Sri Lankan Tamil history